Datuk Lai Kwai Yoon (29 September 1928 - 6 May 2018), known professionally as Lai Meng, was a Malaysian actress. She appeared in many Malaysian and Singaporean films and TV shows, notably Empat Sekawan, Ah Long Pte Ltd, Money No Enough 2, Taxi! Taxi! and Supermum.

Early life 
Lai was born in Benut, Pontian District, Johor, Malaysia on 29 September 1928, her full name was Lai Kwai Yoon. With a passion for singing, Lai joined Malacca Meng Seng Charitable Association's choir and occasionally held performances with the choir. After catching a performance of Lai by chance, an established singer, Hoi Yong struck a friendship with her and would later spark her interest in becoming a singer later on. However due to Lai's godfather's prior experiences while working in gambling dens, he dissuaded Lai from becoming one until when she was 21 in 1949.

Career 
In 1949, Lai started performing on stage in Kuala Lumpur as a getai singer with the stage name, Lai Meng. She soon struck close friendships and would usually perform with Hon Ying, Hoi Yong and Wong Hor. In 1952, the four decided to join a radio station and started broadcasting a radio show, Empat Sekawan, a comedy skit with dialogue in various Chinese dialects intermingled with Malay. Due to the radio show, the four went on to cast in a movie, You Qiu Bi Ying (有求必应) in 1964. Similarly, the multi-dialect laden movie was well received in Malaysia's box office. The radio show was so well received that it evolved into a television show which was broadcast on a Radio Televisyen Malaysia's television channel in 1966. However due to governmental pressure in promoting Mandarin Chinese in Malaysia and the increasing popularity of Hong Kong and Taiwanese television shows within the nation, Empat Sekawan ended broadcast in 1988.

After Empat Sekawan ended and although Lai had lost her job, as the local entertainment industry in Malaysia and Singapore was maturing, she soon joined a movie production company despite her advanced age and knowing that she would not be able to get lead roles anymore. However, the production company also went bankrupt soon after. Due to her husband's illness, Lai took up a sales role to support her family until 2006. Her husband died in 2006.

In 2008, Jack Neo decided to cast Lai in Ah Long Pte Ltd, and attested to her professionalism as an actress. Lai soon accepted roles in the next Jack Neo movie being Money No Enough 2. Her acting did not go unnoticed and was recognised when she was nominated for Golden Horse Award for Best Supporting Actress for portraying an Alzheimer's-ridden mother Money No Enough 2 in 2008. In 2013, Lai also starred in Singaporean movie Taxi! Taxi!.

Retirement and later life 
Lai had a fall in 2016, requiring her to use a wheelchair. She then took a break from acting. Subsequently in 2017, Lai announced her retirement with a 89th birthday gala dinner that was well attended by other artistes and friends from the entertainment industry, saying that even though she didn't earn much over the years, she had no regrets.

Lai Meng passed away on 6 May 2018, at the age of 89 of stroke. She was interred at the living tomb that was given to her in 2013 at the Nirvana Memorial Garden in Semenyih, Selangor.

Before Lai died, she wanted to act one last time for her fans. Her godson, Bjarne Wong decided to honour her wish by directing Supermum, which warm and joyful story-line was influenced by her optimistic personality. However before her scenes could be filmed, her health debilitated with a stroke. Instead, Eliza Wong, a Malaysian actress who called Lai her godmother, played Lai's role of the matriarch, and recorded messages from Lai were included throughout the movie. The movie was released on 30 May 2019, during the time of the year which usually occupied by summer blockbusters. This was done in conjunction with Parents' Day in Malaysia, and as well as a celebration of her first death anniversary.

Filmography

Awards and honours 
In 1978, Lai was awarded the Ahli Mangku Negara by Yang di-Pertuan Agong of Malaysia of the time, Sultan Yahya Petra.

In 2008, Lai was nominated for Golden Horse Award for Best Supporting Actress for portraying an Alzheimer's-ridden mother Money No Enough 2 in 2008.

In 2013, Lai was awarded the title of ‘Datuk’ by the Sultan of Pahang.

In 2017, Lai received the Lifetime Achievement Award at the inaugural Malaysia Golden Global Awards for her various contributions to the Malaysian Chinese film industry.

Notes

References

External links 
 

1928 births
2018 deaths
Malaysian actresses
Members of the Order of the Defender of the Realm
People from Johor